The 47th Yasar Dogu Tournament 2019, was a wrestling event held in Istanbul, Turkey between 11 and 14 July 2019.

This international tournament included competitions in men's and women's freestyle wrestling. It was held as the sixth of the ranking series of United World Wrestling in 2019. This ranking tournament was held in honor of two-time Olympic Champion, Yaşar Doğu.

The Bağcılar Olympic Sports Hall hosted about 300 freestyle wrestlers from 35 countries, competing for the top title in the 47th Yaşar Doğu International Wrestling Tournament.

Medal table

Team ranking

Medal overview

Men's freestyle

Women's freestyle

Participating nations
240 competitors from 29 nations participated.

 (10)
 (1)
 (10)
 (7)
 (5)
 (1)
 (5)
 (6)
 (2)
 (11)
 (17)
 (5)
 (3)
 (6)
 (19)
 (5)
 (5)
 (12)
 (2)
 (2)
 (8)
 (3)
 (14)
 (3)
 (6)
 (1)
 (8)
 (56)
 (7)

Ranking Series
Ranking Series Calendar 2019:
 1st Ranking Series: 24–28 January, Russia, Krasnoyarsk ⇒ Golden Grand Prix Ivan Yarygin 2019 (FS, WW)
 2nd Ranking Series: 9-10 February, Croatia, Zagreb ⇒ 2019 Grand Prix Zagreb Open (GR)
 3rd Ranking Series: 23-24 February, Hungary, Győr ⇒ Hungarian Grand Prix - Polyák Imre Memorial (GR)  
 4th Ranking Series: 28 February-03 March, Bulgaria, Ruse ⇒ 2019 Dan Kolov & Nikola Petrov Tournament (FS, WW, GR) 
 5th Ranking Series: 23-25 May, Italy, Sassari ⇒ Matteo Pellicone Ranking Series 2019 (FS, WW, GR)
 6th Ranking Series: 11–14 July, Turkey, Istanbul ⇒ 2019 Yasar Dogu Tournament (FS, WW)
 7th Ranking Series: 28 February-03 March, Belarus, Minsk ⇒ 2019 Oleg Karavaev Tournament (GR)

References 

Yasar Dogu
2019 in sport wrestling
July 2019 sports events in Turkey
Sports competitions in Istanbul
Yaşar Doğu Tournament
International wrestling competitions hosted by Turkey